The Mack Pinnacle is a series of heavy duty (Class 8) trucks produced by Mack Trucks.  Introduced in 2006, the Pinnacle is the successor of the Mack Vision.  Currently, the product line is sold in the United States and Canada; in Venezuela and Peru, the Pinnacle is marketed as the Mack Vision Elite.

Marketed primarily as a highway tractor, the Pinnacle is sold in a set-forward front-axle configuration (the set-back axle version has been replaced in the United States and Canada by the Mack Anthem).  Mack assembles the Pinnacle in its Lehigh Valley Operations facility in Macungie, Pennsylvania.

Design 
The Pinnacle is a long-hood conventional semi-tractor. Designed for local and regional use it usually has a day-cab but five sleepers, from a  flat top to a  hi-rise, are available. Roof fairing, side shields, and skirts aerodynamic aids are offered.

Advanced electronics are used for engine and chassis controls, as well as maintenance. All trucks have ABS.

In 2019 a new generation Bendix Wingman Fusion was available in the Anthem. It uses radar and cameras to provide emergency braking, lane departure, and blind spot warnings.

Mack builds most of their components (engines, transmissions, and axles) to work together. Trucks can also be custom-designed with vendor components.

Engine 
When introduced for 2006 the Pinnacle used the new MP7 engine, the MP8 was available in 2007. The MP8 is currently the only engine available in the Pinnacle.

The Mack MP7 is a  overhead cam turbocharged inline six-cylinder diesel engine.

The Mack MP8 is a  overhead cam turbocharged inline six-cylinder engine.

Transmissions 
All Mack transmissions have aluminum cases and three counter-shafts. Both Mack and Fuller have manual and automated shifting models. Allison transmissions are available as fully automatic only.

Mack mDRIVE™ automated manual is the base transmission. It has no clutch pedal and shifts itself on demand. The driver can override it but it is normally driven in "D". It can have 12, 13, or 14-speeds. Other Mack manual transmissions have 8-18 speeds.

Fuller UltraShift™automated shifting systems are available on all transmissions from 9- to 18-speeds.

Allison RD series 6-speed transmissions is available. The RDS is a fully automatic planetary gear transmission with a lock-up torque converter.

Frame 
A ladder frame with beam axles is used. The front axle is set forward on semi-elliptical leaf springs. The set-back axle version was replaced by the Anthem in 2017.

The base rear suspension is a Mack tandem (two powered axles) but other axle/suspension combinations are available. Wheelbases are from 

Meritor supplies S-cam air brakes, steering systems, driveshafts, and other components. Front air disc brakes are available.

Axles 
Front axles are available with  rating.

Mack powered axles have the drive carrier on top of the housing. This lets the driveshafts be in line from the transmission to and between the axles at a higher level above the ground. With the higher level above the ground the driveshafts and u-joints are less prone to dirt and damage, important in on/off-road construction.

The Twin Y air suspension is base. It has trailing arms that fork to the rear and attach to both the top and bottom of the axle. There is an air bag behind the axle. Each axle is sprung individually.

The Camelback tandem (two powered axles) was offered in earlier models. This has multiple leaves mounted above the bogey pivot which curve down and under the axles. It was not offered after 2015.

Applications 
The Pinnacle's set-forward front axle and high rectangular grille make it high drag and not well-suited for long-distance hauling. It is available with a sleeper but it is commonly used as a day cab for local and regional hauling, where local laws and conditions restrict length or affect weight distribution.

The Pinnacle has the high ground clearance, strong chassis, and available components for on/off-road construction. It is suited for dump, flatbed, and lowboy use.

On-highway markets for Mack are freight, bulk materials, and farm products like grain and livestock.

References

External links 

  Pinnacle Axle Back at Trucksplanet.com
  Pinnacle Axle Forward at Trucksplanet.com
  The Mack Pinnacle with MP8 505C+ engine at Truck News.com
 Mack Vision Elite homepage - Peru (Spanish)
 Mack Vision Elite homepage - Venezuela (Spanish)

Pinnacle
Vehicles introduced in 2006
Tractor units
Class 8 trucks